The 2017 William Hill World Darts Championship was the 24th World Championship organised by the Professional Darts Corporation since it separated from the British Darts Organisation. The event took place at Alexandra Palace in London from 15 December 2016 to 2 January 2017.

Phil Taylor made a 28th successive appearance at a World Championship (including the BDO version), equalling the record of John Lowe.

For the first time in the history of the World Darts Championship (PDC and BDO), no Englishman progressed to the semi-finals. It was also the first time since 2009 that the final was contested by the top 2 seeds.

Michael van Gerwen set a new record for the highest World Darts Championship 3-dart average (114.05) in his semi-final victory over Raymond van Barneveld, breaking a 15-year record that had been held by Phil Taylor since 2002 (111.21); Van Barneveld himself set a new record for the highest losing 3-dart average (109.34) in the same tie, just 5 days after Cristo Reyes had broken the record in his second round match (106.07), also against Van Gerwen.

Van Gerwen won his second World Championship title by defeating two-times defending champion Gary Anderson 7–3 in the final.

Format
The field consisted of 72 players, including 16 in a Preliminary round. Therefore, 64 players were entered into Round 1. The schedule was announced on 15 July 2016.

The 72 players consist of:
Top 32 players in the PDC Main Order of Merit
Top 16 Pro Tour Order of Merit players
Top 4 European players from the Pro Tour Order of Merit
16 International qualifiers
4 PDPA qualifiers

Prize money
The prize money was £1,650,000 in total. The winner's prize money was increased from £300,000 to £350,000. Prize money for a nine-dart finish was originally set at £5,000, but the PDC increased it to £25,000 due to 'the stature of the tournament', though none were thrown.

Qualifiers
The draw was made on 28 November live on Sky Sports News. The preliminary round draw was made the previous night.

Order of Merit

Pro Tour
  James Wilson 
  Steve West
  Chris Dobey 
  Robbie Green 
  Josh Payne 
  Jermaine Wattimena
  Ronny Huybrechts 
  Joe Murnan
  Darren Webster
  Devon Petersen 
 
  Christian Kist 
  Jonny Clayton
  Ricky Evans 
  Andrew Gilding
  Kevin Painter

European Pro Tour
  Jeffrey de Graaf
  Max Hopp 
 
  Ron Meulenkamp

PDPA QualifierFirst round Qualifier
  Mark Frost

Preliminary round Qualifiers
  Kevin Simm
  Simon Stevenson
  John Bowles

International Qualifiers
First round Qualifiers
  Magnus Caris
  Mick McGowan
  John Michael
Preliminary round Qualifiers
  Corey Cadby
  Masumi Chino 
  Jerry Hendriks
  Dragutin Horvat 
  Boris Koltsov
 
  Warren Parry
  David Platt
  Tengku Shah
  Ross Snook 
  Sun Qiang
  Gilbert Ulang
  Kim Viljanen

1 Kyle Anderson, who would have been the 28th seed, withdrew from the tournament after being unable to secure a British visa. As a result, Cristo Reyes moved into the top 32 seeds, and 2004 runner-up Kevin Painter qualified through the Pro Tour.

Preliminary round
Best of three sets.

Main draw

Final

Statistics

Top averages
This table shows the highest averages achieved by players throughout the tournament.

* The highest average in the history of the PDC World Championship.

** The highest losing average in the history of the PDC World Championship.

*** The highest losing average in the final of a PDC World Championship.

Representation from different countries
This table shows the number of players by country in the World Championship, the total number including the preliminary round. Twenty-two countries were represented in the World Championship, one less than in the previous championship.

Media coverage

The tournament was available in the following countries on these channels:

† Sky Sports F1 was renamed as Sky Sports Darts for the duration of the tournament.

References

External links
Official site
PDC netzone - Schedule and results, 
Live.dartsdata.com - Live Scores, results and match statistics.

2017
World Championship
World Championship
2016 sports events in London
2017 sports events in London
2016 in British sport
2017 in British sport
Alexandra Palace
2017 PDC World Darts Championship
December 2016 sports events in the United Kingdom
January 2017 sports events in the United Kingdom